The Golden Buddha, officially titled Phra Phuttha Maha Suwanna Patimakon, commonly known in Thai as Phra Sukhothai Traimit, is a gold Maravijaya Attitude seated Buddharupa statue, with a weight of 5.5 tonnes (5,500 kilograms). It is located in the temple of Wat Traimit, Bangkok, Thailand. At one point in its history the statue was covered with a layer of stucco and coloured glass to conceal its true value, and it remained in this condition for almost 200 years, ending up as what was then a pagoda of minor significance. During relocation of the statue in 1955, the plaster was chipped off and the gold revealed.

History
The origins of this statue are uncertain. It is made in the Sukhothai Dynasty style of the 13th–14th centuries, though it could have been made after that time. The head of the statue is egg-shaped, which indicates its origin in the Sukhothai period. Given that Sukothai art had Indian influences and metal figures of the Buddha made in India used to be taken to various countries mostly during the Pala period.

Later, the statue was probably moved from Sukhothai to Ayutthaya, about 1403.

Some scholars believe the statue is mentioned in the somewhat controversial Ram Khamhaeng stele. In lines 23–27 of the first stone slab of the stele, "a gold Buddha image" is mentioned as being located "in the middle of Sukhothai City," interpreted as being a reference to the Wat Traimit Golden Buddha.

At some point, the statue was completely plastered over to prevent it from being stolen. The statue was covered with a thick layer of stucco, which was painted and inlaid with bits of coloured glass. It is believed that this plastering-over took place before the destruction of Ayutthaya kingdom by Burmese invaders in 1767. The statue remained among the ruins of Ayutthaya without attracting much attention.

In 1801, King Buddha Yodfa Chulaloke (Rama I) of Siam, after establishing Bangkok as a new capital city of the Kingdom, and after commissioning the construction of many temples in Bangkok, ordered that various old Buddha images should be brought to Bangkok from the ruined temples around the country.

At the time of King Rama III (1824–1851), the statue, still covered with stucco, was installed as the principal Buddha image in the main temple building of Wat Chotanaram (Wat Phraya Krai) in Bangkok.

When Wat Chotanaram, located near Chinatown on the site of modern-day Asiatique, fell into disrepair and was closed, the statue was moved to its present location at the nearby Wat Traimit in 1935. At the time, Wat Traimit was a pagoda of minor significance (like hundreds of other Buddhist temples that exist in Bangkok). Since the temple didn't have a building big enough to house the statue, it was kept for 20 years under a simple tin roof. The true identity of this statue had been forgotten for almost 200 years.

Discovery of the golden statue
In 1954, a new Viharn building was built at the temple to house the statue. It was moved to its new location on 25 May 1955; there are a variety of accounts of what exactly happened next, but it is clear that during the final attempt to lift the statue from its pedestal, the ropes broke and the statue fell hard on the ground. At that moment, some of the plaster coating chipped off, allowing the gold surface underneath to be seen. Work was immediately stopped so that an evaluation could be made.

All the plaster was carefully removed and during the process, photos were taken and are now displayed in the Temple for visitors. Pieces of the actual plaster are also on public display. When all the plaster was removed, it was found that the gold statue actually consisted of nine parts that fit smoothly together. A key was also found encased in plaster at its base, which can be used to disassemble the statue, allowing for easier transportation.

The golden statue was discovered very close to the commemoration of the twenty-fifth Buddhist Era (2500 years since Gautama Buddha's passing) so the Thai news media was full of reports and many Buddhists regarded the occurrence as miraculous.

On 14 February 2010, a large new building was inaugurated at the Wat Traimit Temple to house the Gold Buddha. The building also contains the Bangkok Chinatown Heritage Centre and an exhibition on the origin of the Gold Buddha.

Characteristics

(According to another account, the statue measures 3.91 meters from base to top, and 3.10 meters across the lap from knee to knee.) It can be disassembled into nine pieces. The statue was housed in a wat in Ayutthaya until the mid 19th century, and its provenance from Ayutthaya excludes the possibility of it having been made after about 1750.

At US$1,400 per troy ounce, the gold in the statue (18 karat) is estimated to be worth 250 million dollars. The body of the statue is 40% pure, the volume from the chin to the forehead is 80% pure, and the hair and the topknot, weighing 45 kg, are 99% pure gold.

The Buddha is represented in the traditional pose of Bhumisparsha Mudra (touching the earth with the right hand to bear witness Lord Buddha's enlightenment at Bodh Gaya and victory over Mara). The original statues of Sukhothai sit on a common pedestal form. The flame that crowns the ushnisha is an innovation of Sukhothai that symbolises the splendour of spiritual energy. The line of the hairdressing forms a "V" shape in the root of the hairs, underlined by the elegant curve of the eyebrows that join above the aquiline nose, all according to the prescribed rules. The three wrinkles in the neck and the much elongated ear lobes, signs of his former status of prince, also form part of the code, as do the wide shoulders and the chest inflated.

References

External links

 fotopedia.com Another photo of the Golden Buddha
 Some more photos (before the move to the new building), and a history synopsis: 

Buddha statues in Thailand
Traimit
Gold sculptures
Samphanthawong district
Thai art
Tourist attractions in Bangkok